Russell Earl "Rusty" Richards (born January 27, 1965) is a former American professional baseball pitcher. He played parts of two seasons in Major League Baseball, 1989 and 1990, for the Atlanta Braves.

References

Major League Baseball pitchers
Atlanta Braves players
Gulf Coast Braves players
Sumter Braves players
Durham Bulls players
Greenville Braves players
Richmond Braves players
Orlando Sun Rays players
Texas Longhorns baseball players
Baseball players from Houston
1965 births
Living people